Amalapuram revenue division (or Amalapuram division) is an administrative division in the Konaseema district of the Indian state of Andhra Pradesh. It is one of the three revenue divisions in the district which consists of ten mandals under its administration. Amalapuram is the divisional headquarters.

Administration 
There are 10 mandals in Amalapuram revenue division.

See also 
 List of revenue divisions in Andhra Pradesh
 List of mandals in Andhra Pradesh

References 

Revenue divisions in Konaseema district